Motion Blur: Graphic Moving Image Makers is a book released by onedotzero in 2004. Produced by Shane Walter and Matt Hanson, it features a number of articles about, and interviews with, 28 multimedia artists and graphic houses. It also includes a DVD featuring a number of videos created by the aforementioned artists. The first edition of the book and DVD were housed in a foam cover, with the phrase onedotzero cut through the foam in a stencil fashion; the reprint does not include this cover.

The interviews explore the inspirations and creative processes used by the various artists, groups and graphics houses, as well as looking into their history. The text is accompanied by a vast range of still shots from videos and animations they have produced. The book can easily be thought of as a classic example of a coffee table book.

The book also features two essays entitled "The Seduction of Moving Image" by Shane Walter and "The End of Celluloid" by Matt Hanson.

Featured artists and graphic houses

The following artists/graphic houses are featured in the book:

Caviar/Tycoon Graphics
Geoffroy De Crécy
Drawing and Manual
Eyeballnyc
Felt
Richard Fenwick
Furi Furi
Groovisions
H5
Johnny Hardstaff
Hexstatic
Jeremy Hollister
Tim Hope
Kuntzel + Deygas
Le Cabinet
Logan
Geoff McFetridge
Psyop
Alexander Rutterford
Shynola
Stylewar
Sweden
Tanaka Hideyuki
Tanaka Noriyuki
Tanida Ichiro
Teevee Graphics
The Light Surgeons
Zetguised

DVD

The DVD provides accompanying videos for 26 of the 28 featured artists/graphic houses – Caviar/Tycoon Graphics and Teevee Graphics do not appear.

Further books

A second book, Motion Blur 2: Multidimensional Moving Imagemakers was published in 2008 written by Shane Walter also published by Laurence King.

2004 non-fiction books
Books about film
Filmmaking